Judy Berlin is a 1999 American independent drama film directed by Eric Mendelsohn. It was screened in the Un Certain Regard section at the 1999 Cannes Film Festival. Mendelsohn won the directing prize for Judy Berlin at the 1999 Sundance International Film Festival. This was Madeline Kahn's final film appearance eleven months before her death on December 3, 1999.

Plot
Told in a series of vignettes, the film opens on the morning of the second day of school.  Principal Arthur Gold (Bob Dishy) is married to Alice (Madeline Kahn), although interaction between them immediately hints that the union is unhappy.  Alice babbles frequently, much to Arthur’s chagrin.  Their son David (Aaron Harnick), who is thirty, is depressed after a failed attempt at being a Hollywood filmmaker.

The school Arthur runs is employed by down-and-out teacher Sue Berlin (Barbara Barrie), who prepares her children to view the upcoming solar eclipse, secretary Bea (Anne Meara), lunch lady Marie (Julie Kavner), who discuss dreams and astrology, and bus driver Ceil (Judy Graubart).

At the center of the story is aspiring actress Judy Berlin (Edie Falco), who is Sue’s daughter.  Unlike many of the characters in the film, she is upbeat, excitable and enthusiastic.  While on a walk, David runs into Judy, where they meet up again after having gone to high school together.  Judy discusses her big plans for Hollywood and is overjoyed to hear David is a filmmaker.  He refuses to tell her about his failure.

During class, while her students are making paper cut outs in order to view the eclipse, Dolores Engler (Bette Henritze) wanders into the classroom and asks the children to look outside.  Although a seemingly pleasant woman, she shows symptoms of dementia, as she is forgetful and emotionally imbalanced.  When Sue asks her to leave, Dolores hits her and is removed from the classroom.

David goes and visits the town’s historical society, where Judy is working as a museum demonstrator.  She tells him she hates her job and then asks him out to lunch.  As they eat, they discuss their dreams of filmmaking, where David says he hopes to make a documentary about a town similar to where they live.  Judy is disillusioned by this.

Arthur goes and checks on Sue, who at first assures him she’s fine before breaking down, and saying she will not play games, hinting at her romantic interest in him.  He also appears to be interested romantically in her.

The solar eclipse begins to occur, and the landscape takes on an ethereal, dreamlike appearance.  Alice is greatly moved by the eclipse, and takes her cleaning lady Carol (Novella Nelson), on a walk, calling out to her neighbors in ghostly moans and pretending to walk on the moon.  She stops by neighbor Maddie’s (Carlin Glynn) house to see her refurbished kitchen, to which Maddie informs Alice that she thought they were not on good terms after Alice called her months ago in a rage.  Alice does not recall this incident, hinting that Alice might have a form of dementia herself.  Then they see Arthur arrive home, before he hurries back to the school.  Alice declares cryptically that her husband has left her.

As the eclipse reaches totality, Sue dismisses her class and Arthur visits her again, where they share a brief kiss.  Judy and David continue their walk, where they reminisce over high school and Judy admits she had a crush on David due to his quiet, misanthropic nature.  They come to a playground where Judy sings an old childhood riddle as she frolicks among the equipment.  When they return to the museum, David kisses Judy and then, seeing her unaffected by it, denounces her dreams of Hollywood by telling her the competitive nature of the film industry.  Judy is disheartened and runs away.

Alice and Carol continue their walk, until Carol is relieved of duty and drives off. Alice meets up with Mr. V (Peter Appel), who tells her of an upcoming appointment.  Alice continues on, giving a monologue that shows her disconnect to reality and also her love for Arthur.

Undeterred by David, Judy plans to leave on train for Queens.  David catches her and apologizes and admits to hating goodbyes.  Judy tells him that she will star in one of his movies someday and then boards the train and leaves.  Alice and Arthur greet each other quietly in the streets, and Sue catches Dolores wandering around and tells her that everything will be alright, as the sun begins to show itself again, ending the film.

Cast
 Barbara Barrie as Suzan "Sue" Berlin
 Bob Dishy as Arthur Gold
 Edie Falco as Judy Berlin
 Carlin Glynn as Maddie
 Aaron Harnick as David Gold
 Bette Henritze as Dolores Engler
 Madeline Kahn as Alice Gold
 Julie Kavner as Marie
 Anne Meara as Bea
 Novella Nelson as Carol
 Peter Appel as Mr. V.
 Marcia DeBonis as Lisa
 Glenn Fitzgerald as Tour guide
 Marcus Giamatti as Eddie Dillon
 Judy Graubart as Ceil

See also
List of films featuring eclipses

References

External links
 
 
 

1999 films
1999 drama films
American drama films
American black-and-white films
Films directed by Eric Mendelsohn
American independent films
Films set in New York (state)
1999 independent films
1990s English-language films
1990s American films